Bradshaw is an unincorporated community in Baltimore County, Maryland, United States, located southeast of Kingsville.

References

External links

 St. Stephen's Roman Catholic Church founded 1841
 Salem United Methodist Church founded 1847
 Huber's Family Produce Farm
 Mt. Vista Golf course

Unincorporated communities in Baltimore County, Maryland
Unincorporated communities in Maryland